The Ecclesiastical Committee is a statutory joint committee of the Parliament of the United Kingdom, created by the Church of England Assembly (Powers) Act 1919 to review Church of England measures submitted to Parliament by the Legislative Committee of the General Synod.

It comprises 30 members of the Parliament of the United Kingdom. The Lord Speaker appoints 15 members from the House of Lords, and the Speaker of the House of Commons appoints 15 MPs to serve on the committee. Members are appointed to serve for the duration of a parliament.

Membership
As of July 2021, the membership of the committee is as follows:

See also 
 Joint committee of the Parliament of the United Kingdom
 Parliamentary committees of the United Kingdom

References

External links
 Ecclesiastical Committee website

Eccl
Church of England ecclesiastical polity
1919 establishments in the United Kingdom